Quartz fiber is a fiber created from high purity natural quartz crystals. It is made by first softening quartz rods (in an oxyhydrogen flame) and then creating filaments from the rods. Since natural quartz crystals of high purity are rare, quartz fiber is more expensive than alternatives (glass fiber and high silica fiber) and has limited applications.

Manufacture 
Quartz fiber is made from heating quartz rods with an oxyhydrogen flame. Then, filaments are drawn out of the quartz rod, creating quartz fibers. For optical fibers, germanium and phosphorus can be added to increase the refractive index.

Properties 
Quartz fibers are chemically stable as they are not affected by halogens (for the most part). Quartz fibers also have a higher thermal resistance than S-glass or E-glass.

Applications 

Since quartz fiber is expensive, it has limited applications. It is used mainly for producing composite materials (due to having higher stability compared to glass fiber) and in electrical applications where thermal resistance and dielectric properties are important. It can be used in filtration applications where alternatives such as glass fiber filters cannot be used. Quartz fiber can also be used for physical devices (such as in quartz fiber dosimeters and quartz fiber electrometers).

Quartz fibers can be used in fiber optics. This is due to a quartz fiber having the ability to transport data at a speed of 1 terabit per second, and having a transmission loss of 1 decibel per kilometer.

See also 
 Fused quartz
 Quartz fiber dosimeter

References 

Quartz
Fibers